The 1933 Northwestern Wildcats team represented Northwestern University during the 1933 Big Ten Conference football season. In their seventh year under head coach Dick Hanley, the Wildcats compiled a 1–5–2 record (1–4–1 against Big Ten Conference opponents) and finished in seventh place in the Big Ten Conference.

Schedule

References

Northwestern
Northwestern Wildcats football seasons
Northwestern Wildcats football